"Nematopogon" was also invalidly established by Agassiz in 1847 as an unjustified emendation for the fungus moth genus Nemapogon.


Nematopogon is a genus of the fairy longhorn moth family (Adelidae). Among these, it belongs to subfamily Nematopogoninae, of which it is the type genus.

Selected species
Species of Nematopogon include:
 Nematopogon adansoniella (Villers, 1789)
 Nematopogon chalcophyllis (Meyrick, 1935)
 Nematopogon distinctus (Yasuda, 1957)
 Nematopogon dorsigutellus (Erschoff, 1877)
 Nematopogon magna (Zeller, 1878) (= N. magnus, N. variella, N. variellus)
 Nematopogon metaxella (Hübner, 1813) (= N. metaxellus)
 Nematopogon pilella (Denis & Schiffermüller, 1775) (= N. pilellus)
 Nematopogon robertella (Clerck, 1759)
 Nematopogon schwarziellus Zeller, 1839 (= N. schwarziella)
 Nematopogon sericinellus Zeller, 1847
 Nematopogon swammerdamella (Linnaeus, 1758)
 Nematopogon taiwanella Kozlov, 2001

Footnotes

References

  (2009): Nematopogon. Version 2.1, 2009-DEC-22. Retrieved 2010-MAY-09.
  (2004): Butterflies and Moths of the World, Generic Names and their Type-species – Nematopogon. Version of 2004-NOV-05. Retrieved 2010-MAY-09.

Adelidae
Adeloidea genera
Taxa named by Philipp Christoph Zeller